The women's long jump at the 1974 European Athletics Championships was held in Rome, Italy, at Stadio Olimpico on 2 and 3 September 1974.

Medalists

Results

Final
3 September

Qualification
2 September

Participation
According to an unofficial count, 18 athletes from 10 countries participated in the event.

 (2)
 (2)
 (2)
 (1)
 (2)
 (1)
 (2)
 (3)
 (2)
 (1)

References

Long jump
Long jump at the European Athletics Championships
1974 in women's athletics